Tom Searle (born 26 April 1963) is an Austrian ice hockey player. He competed in the men's tournaments at the 1998 Winter Olympics and the 2002 Winter Olympics.

Career statistics

Regular season and playoffs

International

References

1963 births
Living people
Olympic ice hockey players of Austria
Ice hockey players at the 1998 Winter Olympics
Ice hockey players at the 2002 Winter Olympics
Sportspeople from Hamilton, Ontario
Ice hockey people from Ontario
Brantford Alexanders players
Richmond Renegades players
Capital District Islanders players
Brantford Smoke players